Yumaguzino (Yomağuja) is a rural locality (a selo) and the administrative centre of Yumaguzinsky Selsoviet, Kugarchinsky District, Bashkortostan, Russia. The population was 4,564 as of 2010. There are 37 streets.

Geography 
Yumaguzino is located 35 km northwest of Mrakovo (the district's administrative centre) by road. Ulutup is the nearest rural locality.

References 

Rural localities in Kugarchinsky District